John William Schlitt (born February 3, 1950)  is an American singer, who was the lead singer of the Christian rock band Petra from 1986 until the band's retirement in early 2006. Prior to joining Petra in 1986, Schlitt was the lead vocalist for Head East until retiring from the band in 1980.

Biography

Early years
John Schlitt was born in Lincoln, Illinois. Shortly after, his family moved to Mt. Pulaski where he grew up. Schlitt began singing and showing interest in music from a very young age. When he was 13 years old, he joined a band called Vinegar Hills Hometown Band Something Different. He went to Mt. Pulaski High School in his hometown and graduated in 1968. It was during his high school years that he would meet future wife Dorla Froelich.

After graduating from high school, Schlitt enrolled in the University of Illinois for a degree in Civil Engineering. However, his main interest was still music. In 1972, he joined the rock band Head East as lead singer with some fellow students of the university. Juggling his musical career and college studies, Schlitt finally graduated from college in 1974 and dedicated himself full-time to his career in music.

Head-East era and aftermath

During the following years with Head East, Schlitt enjoyed the success of the band that produced several hits during the 70s. They released five studio and one live album. However, during the time, Schlitt also developed a dependency on cocaine and alcohol.  His dependency reached a peak when he was fired from the band in March 1980.

After leaving Head East, Schlitt formed a short-lived band, "Johnny", with brother Jeff Schlitt, Don Colluci, Jim McNeely, Troy Tipton, Mike Willis and Burk Burkhardt, but the band quickly ended as his addiction intensified in a six-month depression during which he "came very close to suicide". During that same period, however, his wife became a born-again Christian and subsequently convinced Schlitt to see her pastor. Schlitt confesses that he had already decided to end his life and agreed to the meeting only "so my wife would be able to say ‘he tried’ after I was gone".

Schlitt also became a born-again Christian. Following this, Schlitt decided to leave the music scene and rededicate his life to his family. After that, he started cleaning the floors at a factory, and slowly rose through the ranks until he became a mining engineer for a mining construction company and finally their cost and scheduling engineer. During this time, Schlitt attended Gethsemane Church in Evansville, Indiana, where he sang with the praise and worship team.

31 years after being kicked out of Head East, Schlitt appeared with the band once again to mark the band's 2011 induction into the Iowa Rock N Roll Music Association Hall of Fame. Schlitt was also joined by former Head East drummer Steve Huston, along with the band's keyboardist Roger Boyd.

Petra era

Five years after Schlitt's departure from Head East, he received a call from Bob Hartman and was invited to audition for Christian rock band Petra.  The band had just lost its lead singer Greg X. Volz, who had left to pursue a solo career. After a session with Hartman (band's co-founder and guitarist), he was asked to join the band.  He sang his first show on February 3, 1986, beginning a career that would span nearly two decades.  His first album with the band was the 1986 release Back to the Street.

During his career with Petra, the band released two RIAA certified Gold albums (Beyond Belief and Petra Praise: The Rock Cries Out) and earned four Grammy and numerous Dove Awards. His travels and performances with the group reached all 50 American states as well as over 35 countries.

Solo career
During breaks from Petra, Schlitt recorded and released two solo albums: Shake in 1995, and Unfit For Swine in 1996. Both albums were moderately successful and received positive reviews.

After Petra's retirement in 2005, Schlitt and  Petra guitarist and founder, Bob Hartman started working on an album together as II Guys From Petra. An album was released on January 26, 2007 titled Vertical Expressions. Hartman and Schlitt have performed several shows to promote the album.

In addition, Schlitt released his third solo project, titled The Grafting on 2008-01-22. Dan Needham, Schlitt's son-in-law, produced the album. The album was released with premier performances of the tracks "The Grafting" and "Only Men" by Schlitt on the program Celebrations. The telecast was aired internationally by the Daystar Television Network.  In May 2008, John Schlitt toured India, playing eight dates in six cities with an all-new backing band, StoneJava. With this new backing group, John played songs from his solo CDs, along with many Petra favorites, to positive reviews.

In 2012, Schlitt released his fourth solo project, titled The Greater Cause, on 4K Records. Dan Needham, Schlitt's son-in-law, once again produced the album. Hope That Saves The World made the top 30 on the Billboard and Christian Weekly charts in July 2012. 

In 2019 John Schlitt released his sixth studio album, Go.

John Schlitt has earned multiple Gold Records, Grammys and Dove Awards. He has toured all over the world and has been inducted into the Gospel Music Hall of Fame as the lead singer of Petra. John Schlitt was recently named the best rock singer in Christian music history by GospelMusicChannel.com. According to the website, John Schlitt "remains one of the most distinctive and impactful men to ever stand behind a microphone."

Post-Petra era

Schlitt is still active today lending his vocals to various projects and band, including to Project Damage Control, a Christian progressive hard rock band. Schlitt is the lead vocalist of a band, The Union of Sinners and Saints, with White Heart founder, guitarist and songwriter Billy Smiley. He also lends his vocals to the Jay Sekulow Band. Schlitt also released a single, "Fighting the Fight", in February 2019, that he wrote with Ryan Horn and was produced by John Lawry.

Personal life
Schlitt has been married to wife Dorla since August 28, 1971. They have four children together and reside in Franklin, Tennessee.

Discography

Solo

with The Union of Sinners & Saints

with II Guys From Petra

with Petra

with Head East

Other contributions
 Geoff Moore & The Distance - "A Place to Stand" (1988)
 Steve Camp - "Justice" (1988)
 John Lawry - "Media Alert" (1990)
 Carman - "Our Turn Now" (1991)
 4 Him - "The Ride Comes Alive" (1995)
 Morgan Cryar - "What Sin?" (1998)
 Silers Bald - "Real Life" (2003)
 Everlife (2004)
 John DeGroff - "SALT" (2018)

References

External links
 
 

1950 births
Living people
American performers of Christian music
American male singers
American tenors
Converts to Christianity
Performers of Christian rock music
Petra (band) members
People from Lincoln, Illinois